Universal Records Philippines, Inc. is a Philippine record label founded in 1977 as part of Warner Music Group. It has been an independent label since 1992.
The label is currently a member of the Philippine Association of the Record Industry.

History
URPI was founded in 1977 as WEA Records Philippines Inc. The company was the licensee of WEA in the Philippines for 15 years. Nevertheless, the company decided to set up its own office, the forerunner of what is now Warner Music Philippines.

in 1992, the company adopted a new name, Universal Records Philippines Inc. and has since risen to become one of the best and biggest record labels in the Philippines.

Universal Records officially distributed K-pop albums beginning in September 2009, followed by several J-pop albums announced in late May 2011.

Currently, it is the leading independent record label in the country and hosts the best-selling OPM artists.

In 2018, the company launched Mustard Music, a sub-label focused on the growth of homegrown indie acts.

Distributed labels
As of 2011 :

Local
 12 Stone Inc.
 GMA Music 
 Jesuit Communications Foundation
 Jesuit Music Ministry
 Soupstar Music

Foreign
  618 International Records
  AI Entertainment
  All Around the World Productions
  American Laundromat Records
  Angular Recording Corporation
  Arts & Crafts
  Avex Group
  Avex Taiwan
  Avex Asia
  Armada Music
  Johnny's Entertainment
  Kontor Records
 / Major Chord Records
  Purple Communication
  S.M. Entertainment
  Vandit
  Beggars Banquet Records
  Blanco y Negro Records
  Bonnier Amigo Music Group
  Brickhouse Direct
  Cooking Vinyl
  Take Me to the Hospital
  Domino Records
  Edel Music
  Elefant Records
  FNC Music
  Geneon Entertainment (music division)
  Imperial Records
  Instant Karma
  Kitty-Yo
  Labrador Records
  Liberation Music
  Licking Fingers
  LOEN Entertainment
  Stardom Entertainment
  LTM Recordings
  Matador Records
  Moshi Moshi Records
  NeoMONDE Productions
  NH Media
  Nippon Columbia
  Om Records
  PIAS
  Playground Music Scandinavia
  Pledis Entertainment
  Pony Canyon
  Interglobal Music (Pony Canyon MY)
  Leafage
  Secretly Canadian
  Service
  Sincerely Yours
  TC Music
  TVT Records
  Ultra Records
  XL Recordings
  Yejeon Media
  YG Entertainment (until 2012)

Artists

Current artists
 Angelina Cruz (2016–present)

 Better Days (2017–present)
 Christian Bautista (2009–present)
 DJ Loonyo (2021–present)
 Donny Pangilinan (2017–present)
 Dotty's World (2018–present)
 Elmo Magalona (2015–present)
 Gary Valenciano (1983–present)
 Gloc-9 (2012–present)
 I Belong to the Zoo (2022–present)
 Ice Seguerra (2015–present)
 Imago (band) (2006–2010; 2019-present)
 Janina Vela (2017–present)
 JKris (2018–present)
 Julie Anne San Jose (2017–present)
 Karencitta (2017–present)
 Kemrie Barcenas (2020–present)
 Kurei (2019–present)
 Kyle Juliano (2017–present)
 Mark Oblea (2017–present)
 Maine Mendoza (2017–present)
 Noel Cabangon (2009–present)
 Paolo Mallari (2017–present)
 Paolo Sandejas (2018–present)
 Parokya ni Edgar (1993–present)
 Shanti Dope (2017–present)
 Sponge Cola (2006–present)
 TALA (2017–present)
 COLN (2019-present)
 The Knobs (2020–present)
 Troy Laureta (2021–present)

Mustard Music (sublabel)
 Good Kid$ (2018–2020)
 Issa Rodriguez (2018–present)
 Joey tha Boy (2018–present)
 The Ransom Collective (2019-present)
 Timmy Albert (2019-present)
 Barq (Arkin Magalona) (2019-present)
 La Playa (2019-present)

Former artists
 APO Hiking Society (now disbanded)
 Celeste Legaspi
 Samantha Chavez
 Willy Garte
 Roel Cortez
 Sheryl Cruz
 Hotdog (now disbanded)
 Itchyworms (still performing)
 Masta Plann (now currently bases in California]
 Orange and Lemons
 Gino Padilla
 Milyo Naryo
 Max Surban
 Universal Motion Dancers
 The New Everlasting Band
 Jaymie Baby
  Nexxus 
 Jose Mari Chan (1985–2012, still performing) 
 Neocolours (1988–2000)
 Lyon Smith
 Wadab
 George Yang (now chief executive of McDonald's Philippines)
 Flavors
 Willie Revillame (2002–2005) 
 Karylle (2001–2008)
 Geneva Cruz (formerly from Smokey Mountain; moved to Curve Entertainment)
 Jed Madela (2003–2013)
 Dingdong Avanzado (2004–2007)
 Jessa Zaragoza (2004–2007)
 Billy Crawford (2004–2018, moved to VIVA Records)
 Kamikazee (2005–2015)
 Shamrock (2005–2010)
 Lani Misalucha (2006–2010)
 Silent Sanctuary (2006–2012)
 Ogie Alcasid (2007–2016, moved to Star Music)
 Regine Velasquez (2007–2016, returned to VIVA Records)
 Sam Concepcion (2007–2017, moved to VIVA Records)
 Nina (2010–2012) 
 Jaya (2011–2014, now based in the US)
 Callalily (2012–2017, moved to O/C Records)
 Rivermaya (2012–2014, returned to Sony Music Philippines)
 She's Only Sixteen (2012–2015)
 Alden Richards (2013–2015, moved to GMA Music)
 Nikki Gil (2014–2015)
 The Company (2015–2017)
 Rico Blanco (2015–2017, moved to Sony Music Philippines)
 Fern. (2017–2020, moved to Island Records Philippines)
 Claudia Barretto (2016–2020, moved to VIVA Records)

Trade name dispute with UMG

Universal Music Group cannot use the Universal name in the Philippines because URPI owns rights to that brand name. Thus, the UMG business in the Philippines became known as MCA Music, Inc., UMG's former global trade name.

On November 3, 2021, MCA Music changed its current name to UMG Philippines.

See also
 PolyEast Records
 Warner Music Group (ex-parent of URPI)
 Universal Music Group (North American label)

References

External links
 Official site
 
 

 
Philippine independent record labels
Record labels established in 1977
Companies based in Quezon City
Philippine companies established in 1977
Privately held companies